Motanasela is a community council located in the Berea District of Lesotho. Its population in 2006 was 19,817.

Villages
The community of Motanasela includes the villages of Bothoba-Pelo, Furumela, Ha 'Methe, Ha 'Moso, Ha 'Neko, Ha Hoohlo, Ha Keoamang, Ha Khoale, Ha Koali, Ha Kokolia, Ha Kome, Ha Lephoi, Ha Lerata, Ha Lerotholi, Ha Letele, Ha Libe, Ha Lillane, Ha Litsebe, Ha Maetsela, Ha Makoaela, Ha Mantheki, Ha Masheane, Ha Mateka, Ha Matlere, Ha Mautsoe, Ha Moeketsi, Ha Mofota, Ha Mohlakolane, Ha Mokonyana, Ha Molahli, Ha Molangoanyane, Ha Moroke, Ha Morui, Ha Moruthoane, Ha Mosili, Ha Mosiuoa, Ha Mothebesoane, Ha Motšeare, Ha Mpoba, Ha Notši, Ha Ntsane, Ha Pateriki, Ha Peete, Ha Poqa, Ha Rakabaele, Ha Rakheleli, Ha Rakoto, Ha Ramatlama, Ha Ramonyaloe, Ha Ramothamo, Ha Ramothupi (Pitsaneng), Ha Rankatlo, Ha Samosamo, Ha Sebe, Ha Sebekele, Ha Sekhonyana, Ha Selomo, Ha Setulo, Ha Telukhunoana, Ha Tsoaleli, Hloahloeng, Katlehong (Ha Mokonyana), Kotisephola, Machoaboleng, Makaung, Matebeleng, Mokhukhung (Pitsaneng), Moreneng (Pitsaneng), Mosikoto (Pitsaneng), Sefateng, Soaing and Thota-Peli.

References

External links
 Google map of community villages

Populated places in Berea District